The Knockout Stage of the 1994 Federation Cup Americas Zone was the final stage of the Zonal Competition involving teams from the Americas. Those that qualified for this stage placed first, second and third in their respective pools.

The twelve teams were then randomly drawn into a two-stage knockout tournament, with the winners qualifying for the World Group.

Draw

Semifinals

Paraguay vs. Costa Rica

Bolivia vs. Guatemala

Chile vs. Peru

Venezuela vs. Trinidad and Tobago

Cuba vs. Ecuador

Uruguay vs. Mexico

Finals

Paraguay vs. Bolivia

Chile vs. Venezuela

Cuba vs. Mexico

See also
Fed Cup structure

References

External links
 Fed Cup website

1994 Federation Cup Americas Zone